Clavus falcicosta is a species of sea snail, a marine gastropod mollusk in the family Drilliidae.

Description
The whorls are not shouldered. The axial ribs do not undulating on base and are not weakening below the suture. The spiral threads are microscopic or absent, except on the rostrum. The base of the body whorl lacks a row of pustules The terminal varix is strong. The subsutural region is not contrastingly dark.

Distribution
This marine species occurs off KwaZulu-Natal & Zululand, South Africa.

References

 Barnard, K. H. 1958. Contributions to the knowledge of South African marine Mollusca. Pt. 1. Gastropoda: Prosobranchiata: Toxoglossa. Ann. S. Afr. Mus. 44: 73-163

Endemic fauna of South Africa
falcicosta
Gastropods described in 1958